The 39th Infantry Division (Delta Division) was an infantry formation of the Army National Guard, originally formed as the 18th Division in 1917. The division consisted of troops from Arkansas, Louisiana, and Mississippi. After training at Camp Beauregard, Louisiana, the division was deployed to France but did not see combat before the end of World War I. In July 1923 the division was re-designated as the 31st Infantry Division. The 39th Infantry Division was reactivated after World War II with troops from Louisiana and Arkansas and its headquarters in Louisiana. In 1967, the 39th Infantry Division was reorganized to become the 39th Infantry Brigade (Separate). Its headquarters was in Little Rock and the unit consisted entirely of troops from Arkansas.

World War I
In July 1917, a few weeks after the American entry into World War I, it was announced that National Guard units from Arkansas, Mississippi, and Louisiana would be assigned to Alexandria, Louisiana, for training as the 18th Division. Alexandria is the location of Camp Beauregard, named after General P. G. T. Beauregard, C.S.A.

Re-numbering and loss of state designations
Upon transfer to Camp Beauregard, all National Guard units were stripped of their state designations and re-numbered under a new federal system. At this time the division of troops from Arkansas, Louisiana, and Mississippi was re-designated the 39th Division. The 39th "Delta" Division was composed of:

Sickness was a problem for the National Guard troops while at Camp Beauregard. In the later part of October 1917, measles kept the men from drilling. In January 1918, the National Guard Reserve was transferred to the active list. In the same month, the town of Alexandria was placed off limits, and soldiers could not visit other regiments because of an outbreak of meningitis. The off-limits order lasted until 6 March 1918. The soldiers were instructed in the use of deadly gases and then exposed to tear gas, which complicated the health concerns. The soldiers complained about the bugs and were anxious to go to France. By March 1918, the soldiers had received new Enfield rifles. Camp Beauregard was struck with Spanish influenza in early October 1918, which led to lobar pneumonia in many patients. All available facilities were used when the hospitals became overcrowded. The 39th Division was brought up to strength with the addition of soldiers from Ohio, Illinois, and Kentucky.

The entire 39th Division passed in review for the governors of Mississippi and Louisiana in April.

Deployed to France

The army units already engaged in theater were suffering from a personnel shortage. The army had no system for providing replacement soldiers for unit losses. In May 1918, the army offered privates the opportunity to volunteer for duty overseas by agreeing to transfer out of the 39th Division. In the rush to help end the war, officers resigned their commissions so they would qualify for duty overseas before the war was over. Shortly thereafter, Private Robert Springer was the first state guardsman to lose his life in France. Approximately 20 percent of the soldiers of the 39th Division were allowed to volunteer to deploy as individual replacements. In June 1918 the individual replacements arrived in France. The officers remained at Camp Beauregard with the other 80 per cent that were still in training. At Camp Beauregard the division was brought to full strength by the arrival of troops from Camp Zachary Taylor (men from the states of Ohio, Illinois, and Kentucky).

It took 12 months for the entire 39th Division organization to reach France, where it remained for three months, before the war ended. At the time of its departure from the United States, the 39th Division was composed of 22 percent Arkansas National Guard, 40 per cent National Army draftees, and 10 per cent shortage from authorized strength.

The 39th Division, less its artillery units, left Camp Beauregard on 1 August, and sailed for overseas service on 6 August 1918. The first unit of the 39th Division arrived in France on 12 August, and the last unit arrived on 12 September.

Designation as depot division
The 39th Division was designated as the Fifth Depot Division on 14 August 1918, and moved to St. Florent area south-west of Bourges. The greatest American involvement in World War I, the Meuse-Argonne Offensive, began on 26 September. The divisions were so depleted after one week of combat that General John "Blackjack" Pershing, commanding the American Expeditionary Force (AEF) on the Western Front, ordered personnel from the 84th and 86th Divisions, which had just arrived in France, to be used as replacements. The arrangement was supposed to be temporary, and at first only men from infantry and machine gun units served as replacements. Eventually all divisional personnel were taken, except for one enlisted man per company and one officer per regiment who maintained unit records. The manpower shortage persisted. The 31st, 34th, and 38th Divisions were stripped of their personnel and their men used as replacements. The high casualty rate took a toll on all combat units, and Pershing slashed the authorized strength of infantry and machine gun companies from 250 to 175 enlisted men, thereby temporarily reducing each division by 4,000 men.

The units of the 39th, (not the 5th Depot Division) served as training cadres whose duties were to receive, train, equip, and forward replacements of both officers and men for the infantry units and machine gun units, and for ammunition and supply trains. On 29 October 1918, the 39th Division was "skeletonized" with most of the remaining men assigned as replacements and the senior officers attached to the 1st Depot Division (41st Division) at St. Aignan.">

While scrambling for personnel, Pershing reorganized the replacement system, and tried to improve its responsiveness to the flexible army corps and army organizations. Pershing ordered the 40th and 85th Divisions to serve as regional replacement depots for the First and Second Armies, respectively, and the 41st and 83rd as depot divisions in the Services of Supply. Eventually, the 39th and 76th Divisions were stripped of their personnel. The replacement system remained unsatisfactory to the end of the war.

Some units remained intact
In November 1918, the 39th Division moved to St. Aignan, where several of the units were transferred to combat divisions.

The 64th Field Artillery Brigade remained intact and was designated as corps artillery.

The 114th Engineers, 39th Division, were transferred to the I Army Corps in France. The 114th Engineers laid railroad tracks and built bridges for the I Army Corps during the Meuse-Argonne drive.

Some of the division's machine gun battalions began training for a new role when they were re-designated as Anti Aircraft Machine Gun Battalions. They were still in training at the time the armistice was signed.

Demobilization
Most former guardsmen began returning to the United States during January and February 1919. The division returned to the United States for demobilization between 30 November 1919, and 1 May 1919. The division demobilized the following month at Camp Beauregard, Louisiana.

On 12 April 1919, the transport  brought the 64th Field Artillery Brigade and the 141st Machine Gun Battalion of the 39th Division to New York. The headquarters, ordnance, and medical detachments, and some companies of the 114th Engineers, 39th Division were transported to Newport News, Virginia, on the battleship .

The 142nd stayed in France to conduct tests and exercises to develop techniques for motorized artillery battalions and won a commendation for efficient performance. In March 1919, the 1st Battalion, 142nd Artillery, 39th Division was acting as a school battalion for the entire artillery forces of the American Expeditionary Forces with their headquarters at Valdahon, France. In May 1919, word reached Little Rock that the 142nd Field Artillery Battalion (old 2nd Arkansas) was doing convoy duty with the Army of Occupation and a segment was still firing for the Artillery School at Camp Valdahon. It was not until early June when the 142nd Field Artillery left France on the transport . They arrived 15 June 1919, at Newport News, Virginia. On the train trip to Little Rock the 142nd Field Artillery marched in a parade in Atlanta. On 21 June 1919, the group arrived at Camp Pike. On the following day the 142nd Field Artillery was featured in a big parade in Little Rock and then treated to a big show and picnic in the park.

The last group of Guardsmen to return to the United States for discharge was the 114th Sanitary Train (formerly the 1st Arkansas Ambulance Company and the 1st Arkansas Field Hospital), Seventh Army Corps. The 114th Sanitary Train had been stationed for six months at Wittlick, Germany, before being transferred back to the United States.

Unauthorized World War I patch

The 39th Division had been organized from National Guard units from Arkansas, Louisiana, and Mississippi, and had adopted the name "Delta Division" since they were from the delta region of the Mississippi River. After being assigned as a depot division and eventually skeletonized, nothing had been done to adopt a shoulder patch until January 1919, when the 64th Field Artillery Brigade proposed a design for the division's insignia. The 64th had remained intact and had been reassigned as a Corps Artillery unit. The brigade commander, Brigadier General Ira A. Haynes, was the senior officer of what remained of the 39th Division. Haynes attempted to consult with the former division commander, Brigadier General Henry Clay Hodges Jr., but Hodges had been reassigned to Scholfield Barracks in Hawaii. Haynes issued General Order #1, 64th Field Artillery Brigade, on 18 January 1819, which described the insignia and authorized its wear by remaining division personnel. The design was submitted to American Expeditionary Forces (AEF) for approval, but was rejected on the grounds than it only applied to the 64th Field Artillery Brigade (brigades were not authorized to have separate patches) and that the design was too similar to the 3rd Army patch. Haynes applied for reconsideration and, this time, was able to gain the support of Hodges. In his request for reconsideration, Haynes wrote, "The States of Arkansas, Louisiana and Mississippi have long been known as the Delta States. The 39th Division was known to ourselves at least as the Delta Division and our baggage was marked in that way. We take pride in Honoring the State of our origin..." The U.S. Army Adjutant General did not approve the patch, and told Hodges that it would be retained on file, and if the 39th Division were ever activated again, it would be reconsidered. When the 39th Division was reorganized following World War II, a different design was adopted. Nevertheless, many soldiers of the old 39th Division returned home wearing the unauthorized patch.

The World War I patch consisted of a dark blue disc bordered red having upon it a steel gray triangle (the Greek Delta symbol). The area within the triangle was divided into four equilateral triangles, with the lower left red, the top white, the lower right blue, and the central triangle the same dark blue as the disk. There are numerous variations of the World War I design, with the colors of the triangles transposed in various combinations. One common variant has three inner triangles instead of the prescribed four.

Between the world wars
After the war, the division was reorganized in Alabama, Arkansas, Florida, Louisiana, and Mississippi. Because of the change of geographic area, the National Guard requested the division to be re-organized less the Arkansas elements and re-designated as the 31st Infantry Division. The re-designation was approved on 1 July 1923, and the 39th Division disappeared from the rolls until after World War II.

Cold War
The 39th Infantry Division was reconstituted on 30 September 1946. It was composed of units from Arkansas (headquartered in Little Rock, Arkansas) and Louisiana (headquartered at Jackson Barracks, New Orleans). The division artillery commander, a brigadier general, was assigned to command the Arkansas portion of the division, while the division commander remained in Louisiana. During this period the division included the following combat arms units:

153rd Infantry Regiment, Arkansas National Guard
156th Infantry Regiment, Louisiana National Guard
199th Infantry Regiment, Louisiana National Guard
Division Artillery (DIVARTY)
445th Field Artillery Battalion Arkansas National Guard
437th Field Artillery Battalion Arkansas National Guard
935th Field Artillery Battalion Louisiana National Guard
141st Field Artillery Battalion Louisiana National Guard
Armor Unit
206th Tank Battalion

Arkansas element stationing 1946–59

">

Pentomic reorganization of 1959
In 1959, the division was reorganized, along with all other National Guard divisions, in accordance with the new Pentomic Division Concept. This concept attempted to provide a new divisional structure to fight on the atomic battlefield.

Regiments no longer tactical units
The reorganization resulted in the end of the regiment as a tactical unit. Traditionally, regiments were the basic branch element, especially for the infantry, and their long histories had produced deep traditions considered essential to unit esprit de corps. The new divisional structure, replacing infantry regiments with anonymous battle groups, threatened to destroy all of these traditions. Secretary of the Army Wilber M. Brucker settled the question on 24 January 1957 when he approved the Combat Arms Regimental System. Although regiments (armored cavalry notwithstanding) would no longer exist as tactical units, certain distinguished regiments were to become "parent" organizations for the combat arms. Under the new concept, the Department of the Army assumed control of regimental headquarters – the repository for a unit's lineage, honors, and traditions – and used elements of the regiments to organize battle groups, battalions, squadrons, companies, batteries, and troops, which shared in the history and honors of their parent units.

Re-designation of infantry units
In place of the regiment or brigade, the new pentomic infantry division fielded five battle groups, each containing 1,356 soldiers.

The 156th Infantry and 199th Infantry (less 3d Battalion) consolidated 1 July 1959 and the consolidated unit was reorganized as the 156th Infantry, a parent regiment under the Combat Arms Regimental System, to consist of the 1st, 2nd, and 3rd Battle Groups, elements of the 39th Infantry Division.

The 153rd Infantry was reorganized 1 June 1959 as a parent regiment under the Combat Arms Regimental System, to consist of the 1st, and 2nd, Battle Groups, elements of the 39th Infantry Division.

Re-organization and re-designation of artillery units
As a part of the reorganization of 1959 and the shift to the Combat Army Regimental System, the artillery units assigned to the Division were re-designated to their historical artillery regiments:

The 445th Field Artillery Battalion, Arkansas National Guard, was re-designated as the 1st Battalion, 206th Artillery, and was organized as a composite battalion with one battery of 105  mm towed howitzers and one battery of 155 mm towed howitzers.

The 437th Field Artillery Battalion, Arkansas National Guard, was re-designated as the 2nd Battalion, 206th Artillery and was organized as a composite battalion with one battery of 105  mm towed howitzers and one battery of 155 mm towed howitzers.

The 935th Field Artillery Battalion, Louisiana National Guard, was consolidated with the 141st Field Artillery Battalion and the consolidated unit was re-designated as the 1st Battalion, 141st Artillery. The new battalion was organized as a composite battalion with one battery of 105  mm towed howitzers and one battery of 155 mm towed howitzers.

A new battalion was created in the Arkansas National Guard from existing units, 3rd Battalion, 206th Artillery was a composite unit with one 8-inch howitzer battery and one MGR-1 Honest John rocket battery.

Reorganization of 1963
By 1963 the army again changed the basic design for a division. The battle groups of the pentomic division had proved to be unwieldy, and it was felt that their span of control was not sufficient to handle all of the various units and troops assigned to their command. The army reverted to the infantry battalion as the basic building block and provided for additional command and control by providing a brigade headquarters. The 1st and 2nd Brigade, 39th Division were allocated to the Louisiana National Guard, while the 3rd Brigade was allocated to the Arkansas National Guard.

Infantry
The 153rd Infantry was reorganized to consist of the 1st, 2nd, and 3rd Battalions.

The 156th Infantry was reorganized to consist of the 1st, 2nd, 3rd and 4th Battalions.

Artillery
The 1st Battalion, 206th Field Artillery was deactivated and the 3rd Battalion, 142nd Field Artillery was added to the 39th Division Artillery. The 3rd Battalion, 142nd Field Artillery had previously been under the command and control of the 142nd Field Artillery Group.

The 3rd Battalion, 206th Field Artillery was reduced to one Honest John Rocket Battery, Battery A.

Armor
The 206th Armor was expanded to consist of the 1st and 2nd Battalion, 206th Armor Regiment.

Little Rock Central High School integration crisis

The Arkansas portion of the 39th Infantry Division were ordered into active federal service on 24 September 1957 at home stations, in support of the Little Rock Central High School integration crisis in Little Rock Arkansas. The 1st and 3rd Battalions of the 153rd Infantry Regiment were mobilized at Camp Robinson for duty at Central High School. Task Force 153rd Infantry remained on duty at Central High School for the remainder of the 1957–1958 school year. The task force was constantly mentioned in daily situation report for President Eisenhower. The 39th was released on 24 October 1957 from active federal service and reverted to state control.

Reorganization and re-designation as 39th Infantry Brigade
During the 1960s, the Department of Defense continued to scrutinize the reserve forces. It questioned the number of divisions and brigades, as well as the redundancy of maintaining two reserve components, the National Guard and the Army Reserve. In 1967, Secretary of Defense Robert McNamara decided that 15 combat divisions in the Army National Guard were unnecessary. He cut the number to eight divisions (one mechanized infantry, two armored, and five infantry), but increased the number of brigades from seven to 18 (one airborne, one armored, two mechanized infantry, and 14 infantry). The loss of the divisions did not set well with the states. Their objections included the inadequate maneuver element mix for those that remained and the end to the practice of rotating divisional commands among the states that supported them. Under the proposal, the remaining division commanders were to reside in the state of the division base. No reduction, however, in total Army National Guard strength was to take place, which convinced the governors to accept the plan. The states reorganized their forces accordingly between 1 December 1967 and 1 May 1968.

On 1 December 1967, the Arkansas portion of the 39th Division was reorganized and redesignated as the 39th Infantry Brigade.
The new 39th Infantry Brigade (Separate) was composed of elements of the following units:

1st Battalion, 153rd Infantry Regiment
2nd Battalion, 153rd Infantry Regiment
3rd Battalion, 153rd Infantry Regiment
Troop E, 151st Cavalry Regiment
5th Battalion, 206th Field Artillery Regiment
39th Support Battalion

The division's units from Louisiana were reassigned to the newly created 256th Infantry Brigade. The 256th Infantry Brigade (Separate) was composed of the following units:

1st Battalion, 156th Infantry Regiment
2nd Battalion, 156th Infantry Regiment
3rd Battalion, 156th Infantry Regiment
Troop A, 108th Cavalry Regiment
1st Battalion, 141st Field Artillery Regiment
256th Support Battalion

Current unit
The 39th Division is currently known as the 39th Infantry Brigade Combat Team (United States), of the Arkansas Army National Guard, headquartered at the Robinson Maneuver Training Center, North Little Rock, Arkansas.

Commanding officers

References

External links 

AR National Guard
AR Air National Guard
AR Army National Guard
The Arkansas National Guard Museum
Bibliography of Arkansas Army National Guard History compiled by the United States Army Center of Military History
 The Arkansas National Guard, Arkansas National Guard Home
 The Encyclopedia of Arkansas History and Culture
 Rhode Island National Guard, 103rd Field Artillery Regiment, headquarters and Headquarters Service Battery
 United States Navy Combat Narrative, The Aleutian Islands Campaign, June 1942 – August 1943, Naval Historical Center
 206th Field Artillery Vets on Google sites

Divisions of the United States Army National Guard
Military units and formations established in 1917
Military units and formations disestablished in 1967
1917 establishments in Louisiana
1967 disestablishments in Arkansas
Military units and formations in Arkansas
Military units and formations in Louisiana
Military units and formations in Mississippi
United States Army divisions of World War I